The Mask Temple Fair was the ninth season of The Mask Singer, a Thai singing competition program presented by Kan Kantathavorn. The program aired on Workpoint TV on Thursdays at 20:05 from 13 February 2020 to 21 May 2020.

The tournament format was similar to that of The Mask Project A. But the difference was that this season was combined with temple fair.

Panel of Judges

First round

Group 1

Group 2

Group 3

Semi-final

Group 1

Group 2

Group 3

Final

Champ VS Champ

Champ of the Champ

Celebration of The Mask Champion

Elimination table

References 

The Mask Singer (Thai TV series)
2020 Thai television seasons